Pleasant Hill High School may refer to:

Pleasant Hill High School (Illinois), Pleasant Hill, Illinois
Pleasant Hill High School (Louisiana), Pleasant Hill, Sabine Parish, Louisiana
Pleasant Hill High School (Missouri), Pleasant Hill, Missouri
Pleasant Hill High School (Oregon), Pleasant Hill, Oregon
Pleasant Hill High School (California), Pleasant Hill, California